Prado is a municipality in the Tolima department of Colombia.  The population of the municipality was 9,291 as of the 1993 census.

External Links 

 Official Website  (In Spanish) 

Municipalities of Tolima Department